Mongolia features a rich tradition of classical music and ballet. The classical music owes its prosperity in the 2nd half of the 20th century to a patronage of the then Socialist government that favoured Western and Russian/Soviet classical arts to Western pop culture. In addition, the Mongolian composers developed a rich diversity of national symphony and ballet.

 
Composers
Mongolia